Elections were held in Calabarzon for seats in the House of Representatives of the Philippines on May 9, 2016.

The candidate with the most votes won that district's seat for the 17th Congress of the Philippines.

Summary

Antipolo

1st District
Roberto Puno is term-limited as he has reached the maximum three-term limit for any elective official.  His wife, media personality Chiqui Roa-Puno, will run instead and will be challenged by incumbent first district councilor Juanito "Dudok" Lawis.

2nd District
Romeo M. Acop is running for reelection for his third and final term unopposed.

Batangas

1st District
Eileen Ermita-Buhain is the incumbent. She changed her party affiliation from Lakas to Nacionalista.

2nd District
Raneo Abu is the incumbent.

3rd District
Nelson Collantes is the incumbent. His opponent is DZJV reporter Nestor Burgos. On October 17, Burgos withdrew his candidacy, thus resulting to Collantes running unopposed. On December 10, Collantes also withdrew his candidacy to give way to his wife, Maria Theresa.

4th District
Incumbent Mark Llandro is the last Representative of the 4th District of Batangas. Running for a seat are former Board Member Lianda Bolilia and incumbent Taysan Mayor Victor Portugal, Jr.

5th District (Batangas City)
Incumbent 2nd District Board Member Mario Vittorio Mariño will run for the newly created 5th District against Danilo Berberabe, Felipe Baroja, Carloto Bisa and former Justice Secretary Hernando Perez.

6th District (Lipa City)
Incumbent Mark Llandro Mendoza who came from the 4th District is term-limited and is running for Governor. Running for a seat in Congress is Bernadette Sabili, wife of Mayor Meynard Sabili and incumbent Governor Vilma Santos-Recto. Initially, Sabili is running under the National Unity Party. Like her husband, the party withdrew her nomination due to its coalition with the Liberal Party. As a result, Sabili is running as an independent.

Biñan
By virtue of Republic Act No. 10658 authored by Laguna 1st district Rep. Danilo Fernandez, a new district was carved out of the existing 1st district and is composed solely of Biñan City. Incumbent Biñan Mayor Marlyn Alonte-Naguiat of the Liberal Party will run for the newly created district unopposed.

Cavite

1st District
The 1st district is composed of Cavite City, and the municipalities of Kawit, Noveleta, and Rosario.

First term incumbent Francis Abaya, who was elected with 77% of the vote in 2013, is seeking re-election. Marina Rieta Granados of the Nationalist People's Coalition is running against him.

2nd District
The 2nd district is composed solely of the city of Bacoor.

Two-term incumbent Lani Mercado-Revilla decided not to run for re-election and instead run for mayor of Bacoor. Her brother-in-law, incumbent Bacoor Mayor Strike Revilla is her party's nominee. Marc Orlin Buena of the Liberal Party is running against him.

3rd District
The 3rd district is made up solely of the city of Imus.

First term incumbent Alex Advincula, who was elected with 66% of the vote in 2013, is running for re-election unopposed.

4th District
The 4th district is composed solely of the city of Dasmariñas.

Three-term incumbent Elpidio Barzaga, Jr. is barred by term limits from seeking another term. He is instead running for mayor of Dasmariñas. His wife, incumbent Mayor Jennifer Barzaga is his party's nominee. Independent candidate Alen Manzano is also running for the seat.

5th District
The 5th district is composed of the municipalities of Carmona, General Mariano Alvarez, and Silang.

Two-term incumbent Roy Loyola, who was unopposed for re-election 2013, is seeking another term. Running against him is former Silang Mayor Ruben Madlansacay.

6th District
The 6th district is made up of the cities of General Trias, and Trece Martires as well as the municipalities of Amadeo, and Tanza.

First term incumbent Luis "Jon-Jon" Ferrer IV, who was elected with 68% of the vote in 2013, is seeking re-election unopposed.

7th District
The 7th district is composed of the city of Tagaytay and the municipalities of Alfonso, General Emilio Aguinaldo, Indang, Magallanes, Maragondon, Mendez, Naic, and Ternate.

First term incumbent Abraham Tolentino, who was elected with 54% of the vote in 2013, is running for a second term unopposed.

Laguna

1st District
Laguna's 1st legislative district was previously composed of the cities of Biñan, Santa Rosa, and San Pedro. The district was redistricted by virtue of Republic Act 10658 which created a lone district for Biñan.

Incumbent Danilo Fernandez, who was re-elected with 75% of the vote in 2013, is barred by term limits from seeking re-election and is instead running for Mayor of Santa Rosa. His party, the Liberal Party, nominated incumbent Santa Rosa Mayor Arlene Arcillas who is running unopposed.

2nd District
The 2nd district is composed of the cities of Calamba, and Cabuyao as well as the municipalities of Los Baños and Bay.

Joaquin Chipeco, Jr., who was re-elected with 61% of the vote in 2013, is seeking another term unopposed.

3rd District
The 3rd district is composed of San Pablo City, and the municipalities of Alaminos, Calauan, Liliw, Nagcarlan, Rizal, and Victoria.

First term incumbent Sol Aragones, who was elected with 51% of the vote in 2013, is seeking another term. Former San Pablo Mayor Florante Aquino, who represented this district from 1987 to 1998, is running against her. Also running is Damaso Amante of the Nationalist People's Coalition.

4th District
The 4th district is made up of the municipalities of Cavinti, Famy, Kalayaan, Luisiana, Lumban, Mabitac, Magdalena, Majayjay, Paete, Pagsanjan, Pakil, Pangil, Pila, Santa Cruz, Santa Maria, and Siniloan.

First term incumbent Benjamin Agarao Jr., who was elected with 46% of the vote in 2013, is seeking re-election. Former representative Edgar San Luis, who represented this district from 2007 to 2013 is running against him. Also running for the seat is independent candidate Fidel Santos. Agarao and San Luis previously faced each other to represent this district in 2007 in an election San Luis won.

Quezon

1st District
Incumbent Wilfrido Mark Enverga is term limited. His sister, Trina is his party's nominee. Her opponents are former Congressman Irvin Alcala, Board Member Teresita Dator and former Vice Governor Carlos Portes.

2nd District
Incumbent Vicente Alcala is running for reelection. His opponents are former Tiaong Mayor Vivencio Escueta and incumbent Sariaya Mayor Rosauro Masilang.

3rd District
Incumbent Aleta Suarez is not running. She changed her party affiliation from Lakas to UNA. Her husband, former Congressman Danilo Suarez is her party's nominee and is running unopposed.

4th District
Angelina Tan is the incumbent and her main opponent is former Congressman Lorenzo Erin Tañada.

Rizal

1st District
Joel Roy R. Duavit is the incumbent but not running for reelection. His party nominated his brother and former congressman Michael John "Jack" Duavit.

2nd District
Isidro Rodriguez Jr. is the incumbent.

References

External links
Official COMELEC results 2016

2016 Philippine general election
May 2016 events in the Philippines
Lower house elections in Calabarzon